The British Academy Video Games Award for Narrative is an award presented annually by the British Academy of Film and Television Arts (BAFTA). It is given to recognize "excellence in the creation and delivery of the best story or narrative that captivates and engages the player". The award is given to the writers/development team, the developer and the publisher of the winning game. The award was first presented at the 3rd British Academy Games Awards under the name Screenplay. The following year it was renamed into Story and Character. From the 6th edition to the 12th, it was presented as Story. Since the 13th British Academy Games Awards, it has been presented with its current name. 

Naughty Dog and Santa Monica Studio are the only developers with two wins in the category, while Ubisoft Montreal are the developer with the most nominations without a win, with five. Among publishers, Sony Interactive Entertainment has a leading nineteen nominations, with six wins. Bethesda Softworks, Ubisoft and Electronic Arts are tied for most nominations without a win, with seven each. To date, two writers (Neil Druckmann and Cory Barlog) have won the BAFTA twice for their work on The Last of Us and God of War franchises respectively. With three nominations, Tim Schafer is the most nominated writer without a win.

The current holders of the award are Wren Brier, Tim Dawson and Annie VanderMeer, writers of Unpacking by Witch Beam and Humble Bundle, which won at the 18th British Academy Games Awards in 2022.

Winners and nominees
In the following table, the years are listed as per BAFTA convention, and generally correspond to the year of game release in the United Kingdom.

 Note: The games that don't have recipients on the table had Development Team or Writing Team credited on the awards page.

Multiple nominations and wins

Writers

Developers

Publishers

References

External links
 Official website

Narrative